William Bateman Leeds (September 19, 1861June 23, 1908) was an American businessman. He dominated the tin plate industry, becoming known as the "Tin Plate King".  Together with William Henry Moore, Daniel G. Reid and James Hobart Moore, he became known as one of the 'big four' or 'tin plate crowd' in American industry.

Early life 
Leeds was born in 1861, to parents Noah Smith Leeds and Hannah Star Leeds in Richmond, Indiana. After receiving an education at public schools, Leeds worked as a florist. 

In 1883, he married Jeannette Gaar, a relative of Harry Miller, general superintendent of the Pennsylvania Railroad.

Career 
In 1883, Leeds joined an engineering corps. Three years later, Leeds was employed by the Cincinnati and Richmond Railroad, where he became division superintendent in 1890. 

Leeds first went into the tin-plate industry with partners who invested about $250,000, and the company failed. Later, Leeds founded the American Tin Plate Co. in 1898, with his partners Daniel G. Reid, William H. Moore and James H. Moore. The company grew to consist of over 200 companies, and gained control of as much as 90% of the tinplate industry. The company expanded to comprise over 28 mills in Elwood.William McKinley passed a tin tariff, in part to protect their business. They organized the National Steel Corporation in 1899 to provide steel to the tin company, with about $50 million in stock. The company sold for as much as $40 million to U.S. Steel.

Leeds was also involved in founding the National Steel Corporation, American Sheet Steel Company and the American Steel Hoop Company He became president of Chicago, Rock Island and Pacific Railroad in 1902. In 1904, he was ousted from the company after a disagreement with his partners. Leeds was heavily involved with National Biscuit Company, Diamond Match Company, Tobacco Products Corporation and American Can Company. Additionally, he was the director of the Audit Co. of New York, Elwood, St. Louis and San Francisco Railroad, Burlington, Cedar Rapids and Northern Railway, Chicago and Eastern Illinois Railroad, United States Mortgage and Trust Co., Anderson and Lapelle Railroad Company, Nassau Gas, Heat and Power Co., Nassau Light and Power Co., and the Windsor Trust Co.

The Liberty ship  was named after him. Leeds was an avid yachtsman, and had membership in the New York, the Seawanhaka Corinthian, Brooklyn, Larchmont, and American Yacht Clubs. He maintained membership in the Meadow Brook club, Automobile Club of America, and The Brook club. The 'Billy Bi' soup was named after him. Leeds was also an avid horseman.

Pearl necklace
Leeds purchased a pearl necklace for his wife. The necklace cost $360,000 when he bought it, but he only paid the ten percent tariff on pearls, rather than the sixty percent tariff on a pearl necklace. The United States filed suit, and for several years, as the case was litigated, the "Leeds pearls were the most famous jewels in America."

Personal life 
On August 16, 1883, Leeds married his first wife, Jeanette Irene Gaar, in Wayne, Indiana. She was a relative of Harry Miller, superintendent of Pennsylvania Railroad. On March 15, 1886, their only child, Rudolph Gaar Leeds (d. November 21, 1964), was born in Indiana. He was the proprietor of The Richmond Palladium and The Indianapolis Sun, two major newspapers in Indiana.

On August 2, 1900, Leeds married his second wife, Nonie May Stewart-Worthington, whose first husband was George Ely Worthington (1872–1950), grandson of industrialist George Worthington.
On September 19, 1902, their only child, William Bateman Leeds Jr., was born in New York City.

On June 23, 1908, Leeds died in Paris, France. Leeds was 46. Leeds is buried in Richmond, Indiana.

His second wife, Nonie, went on to marry Prince Christopher of Greece and Denmark, an uncle of Prince Philip, Duke of Edinburgh.  and took the name “Anastasia” upon joining the Greek Orthodox Church, becoming known as “Princess Anastasia of Greece and Denmark”.

Nonie and Leeds's son, William Jr., later married one of Prince Christopher's nieces, Princess Xenia Georgievna of Russia. The couple were married in Paris, and lived in Long Island. They had one daughter before divorcing in March 1930.

See also
 Princess Anastasia of Greece and Denmark, title of Leeds' second wife after his death

References

External links 
 William B. Leeds Sr at major-smolinski.com

1861 births
19th-century American businesspeople
1908 deaths
American industrialists
American billionaires
American company founders
American steel industry businesspeople
People from Richmond, Indiana